Washington Township is one of nine townships in Whitley County, Indiana, United States. As of the 2010 census, its population was 1,281 and it contained 498 housing units.

Geography
The streams of Cox Branch and Huffman Branch run through this township.

Unincorporated towns
 Briggs at 
 Laud at 
 Peabody at 
 Tunker at 
 Washington Center at 
(This list is based on USGS data and may include former settlements.)

Adjacent townships
 Columbia Township (north)
 Union Township (northeast)
 Jefferson Township (east)
 Jackson Township, Huntington County (southeast)
 Clear Creek Township, Huntington County (south)
 Warren Township, Huntington County (southwest)
 Cleveland Township (west)

Major highways
  Indiana State Road 9
  Indiana State Road 14
  Indiana State Road 114

References
 U.S. Board on Geographic Names (GNIS)
 United States Census Bureau cartographic boundary files

External links
 Indiana Township Association
 United Township Association of Indiana

Townships in Whitley County, Indiana
Townships in Indiana